Johann Eberlin von Günzburg (c. 1470 in Kleinkötz near Günzburg in Bavaria – 1533 in Leutershausen) was a German theologian and reformer who became prominent as the author of reformist flysheets and pamphlets.

Life
Eberlin studied theology in Ingolstadt and qualified in 1490 in Basle as Master of Arts. In Heilbronn he joined the Franciscan Order. From 1493 he was in Freiburg im Breisgau, from 1519 in Tübingen, where he was active as a preacher, and from 1521 in Ulm. Here he left the order and joined the Reformation movement. Eberlin was married in 1524, he had 4 children.

He studied in 1522 with Martin Luther and Philipp Melanchthon in Wittenberg and from 1523 worked in Basle and Rheinfelden. In 1524 he became a preacher in Erfurt and in 1525, spiritual adviser to Count Georg II von Wertheim. Here was created his translation of the Germania of Tacitus, the oldest German translation of the work. After the death of Georg II in 1530, Eberlin became curate of Lautershausen, where he died three years later.

Works
15 Bundsgenossen, 1521
Wider die Schänder der Kreaturen Gottes durch Weihen oder Segnen, 1521
Der 7 frommen, aber trostlosen Pfaffen Klage, 1521
Mich wundert, daß kein Geld im Land ist, 1524
Wie sich ein Diener Gottes Worts in allem seinem Tun halten soll, und sonderlich gegen die, denen das Evangelium zuvor nicht gepredigt ist, daß sie sich nicht ärgem, 1525 
Eine getreue Warnung an die Christen in der Burgauischen Mark, sich auch füro zu hüten vor Aufruhr und falschen Predigern, 1525

External links
(in German):
Literature by and about Eberhard von Günzburg at the Staatsbibliothek, Berlin

1470s births
1533 deaths
People from Günzburg (district)
16th-century German Protestant theologians
16th-century German Lutheran clergy
German Protestant Reformers
University of Ingolstadt alumni
University of Wittenberg alumni
German male non-fiction writers
16th-century German male writers